The Specialists may refer to:

 The Specialists (film), a 1969 Spaghetti Western by Sergio Corbucci
 The Specialists (TV series), a 1992 animated series on MTV
 The Specialists, a GoldSrc mod for the computer game Half-Life

See also
 Specialist (disambiguation)